Pulmonary artery sling is a rare condition in which the blood vessels between the heart and the lungs have formed incorrectly before birth.  It is a type of cardiovascular condition called a vascular ring.The main treatment is surgery.

Symptoms and signs
Symptoms include cyanosis, dyspnoea and apnoeic spells. Rarely it is asymptomatic and is detected incidentally in asymptomatic adults.

Cause 
In pulmonary artery sling, the left pulmonary artery anomalously originates from a normally positioned right pulmonary artery. The left pulmonary artery arises anterior to the right main bronchus near its origin from the trachea, courses between the trachea and the esophagus and enters the left hilum.

Treatment 
It almost always requires surgical intervention.  The surgery is usually open heart surgery with an incision through the sternum.

History
The first known case of pulmonary artery sling was diagnosed and surgically repaired by Willis J. Potts at Lurie Children's Hospital in 1953.

References

External links 

Vascular diseases
Congenital vascular defects
Rare diseases